Donald Jon Brown (born 3 January 1981) is an Australian politician. He has been the Labor member for Capalaba in the Queensland Legislative Assembly since 2015.

Early life 
Prior to entering politics, Brown has studied applied science and law at Queensland University of Technology, and had worked as a pathology scientist, and as a union official for United Voice.

Political career
He has served as the Chief Government Whip in the Queensland Legislative Assembly since December 2017.

References

1981 births
Living people
Members of the Queensland Legislative Assembly
Australian Labor Party members of the Parliament of Queensland
Queensland University of Technology alumni
Australian trade unionists
Australian pathologists
People from Redland City
21st-century Australian politicians